Sibay is a town in the Republic of Bashkortostan, Russia.

Sibay may also refer to:
Sibay Urban Okrug, a municipal formation which the town of republic significance of Sibay in the Republic of Bashkortostan, Russia is incorporated as
Sibay Airport, an airport in the Republic of Bashkortostan, Russia
Sibay Island, an island in Philippines where the US ship Patrick Henry wrecked in 1923